San Fernando East is a parliamentary electoral district in the city of San Fernando, Trinidad and Tobago.

San Fernando East consists of the eastern part of the city of San Fernando. It came into effect in time for the 1956 Trinidad and Tobago general election.

Members of Parliament 
This constituency has elected the following members of the House of Representatives of Trinidad and Tobago:

Election results

Elections in the 2020s

Elections in the 2010s

References 

 
San Fernando, Trinidad and Tobago